Ajit Jain (born 1951) is an Indian-American executive who is the Vice Chairman of Insurance Operations for Berkshire Hathaway as of January 10, 2018. Ajit Jain is an older cousin of Anshu Jain, who was the former Co-CEO of Deutsche Bank.

Education 
He did his schooling at Stewart School, Cuttack. In 1972, Jain graduated from the IIT Kharagpur in India with a BTech degree in Mechanical Engineering.

Career 
From 1973 to 1976, Jain worked for IBM as a salesman for their data-processing operations in India. He was named "Rookie of the Year" in his region in 1973. He lost his job in 1976 when IBM discontinued their operation in India because they declined to allow any Indian ownership of the company, as was then required by law.

In 1978, Jain moved to the United States, where he earned an MBA from Harvard University and joined McKinsey & Co. He returned to India in the early 1980s and married. The Jains then moved back to the United States, as Jain's wife preferred to live there.

In 1986, he left McKinsey to work on insurance operations for Warren Buffett. Jain was invited by his former boss, Michael Goldberg, who had left McKinsey & Co. to join Berkshire Hathaway in 1982. At the time, he said he knew little about the insurance business.

In the annual letter to shareholders on 2014, it was suggested that both Jain and Greg Abel could be appropriate successors for Warren Buffett as CEO of Berkshire Hathaway. In January 2018, Jain was named Berkshire Hathaway's vice chair of insurance operations and appointed to Hathaway's board of directors.
Jain lives in the New York City area.

Philanthropy 
In 2005, Jain established the Jain Foundation, a non-profit organization located in Seattle, Washington, the mission of which is to cure limb-girdle muscular dystrophies caused by dysferlin protein deficiency, a condition that Jain's son has. Jain's son Akshay is the chairman and CEO of the Jain Foundation. Douglas Albrecht and Laura Rufibach are co-presidents of the Jain Foundation.

See also 
 List of Jains
 Indians in the New York City metropolitan region

References

Further reading 
 Matthews, Jeff, "Secrets in Plain Sight: Business and Investing Secrets of Warren Buffett," eBooks On Investing, 2012.

American Jains
Indian emigrants to the United States
Harvard Business School alumni
Living people
1951 births
IIT Kharagpur alumni
American people of Indian descent
American businesspeople